Ezriel Auerbach (born 1937), also known as Azriel Auerbach, is a prominent Haredi rabbi and posek. He is the son of Rabbi Shlomo Zalman Auerbach, and son-in-law of Rabbi Yosef Shalom Elyashiv, two renowned poskim. He was considered Rabbi Elyashiv's right-hand man in matters of halakha.

Auerbach married Leah Elyashiv (1938–2010), daughter of Rabbi Elyashiv, in 1960. They had no children. On October 11, 2012, at the age of 75, Auerbach became engaged to Minna Elyashiv, age 58, the widow of Rabbi Avraham Elyashiv, grandson of Rabbi Yosef Shalom Elyashiv.

Rulings
In matters of Halakhic dispute between Rabbi Shlomo Zalman Auerbach and Rabbi Elyashiv, apparently, Rabbi Ezriel Auerbach tends to rule privately in accordance with his father, while avoiding a public stand, in deference to his father-in-law.

References

Living people
Israeli Rosh yeshivas
20th-century Israeli rabbis
21st-century Israeli rabbis
1937 births